Samuel Seward Burton (April 10, 1822December 22, 1892) was an American lawyer, judge, and banker.  He served one term in the Wisconsin State Assembly, representing La Crosse County, and was county judge of La Crosse County for 6 years.

Biography
Samuel Burton was born in April 1822 at Manchester, Vermont.  He was raised on his father's farm and was educated at the Burr and Burton Academy in Manchester.  He read law in the office of his cousin, Judge Elias Black Burton, and his partner Ahiman Louis Miner, and was admitted to the bar in 1850.  He then joined his cousin's law firm and practiced with them until the firm dissolved in 1857.

He moved to La Crosse, Wisconsin, in April of 1857 and participated in a law firm known as Tucker, Burton & Morse.  He left the firm when he was appointed county judge by Governor Alexander Randall in May 1859.  He filled the 30 months remaining of the judicial term, and was then elected to a full term, serving until January 1866.  

While serving as judge, he was elected to the Wisconsin State Assembly in November 1863, running on the National Union ticket.  He was appointed receiver of public moneys at the land office in La Crosse in 1867, serving until 1875.  During that time he also formed a legal partnership with Gilbert M. Woodward, known as Burton & Woodward, which endured until 1877.  

He was then appointed receiver of the First Bank of La Crosse after its failure in April 1876.  
The next year he abandoned the legal profession in order to assist in the organization of the National Bank of La Crosse.  He served as "cashier" (comptroller) of the bank until his death. 

He died of gangrene in December 1892.

Personal life and family
Samuel Burton was a son of Joseph Burton and his wife Anna ( Benedict).  Joseph Burton served with the Vermont militia during the War of 1812 and established a farm near Manchester.  His grandfather, Josiah Burton, served in the American Revolutionary War.  The Burtons are descended from Solomon Burton, who immigrated to Connecticut Colony from England about 1687.

Samuel Burton married Mary-Ann Munson in Manchester on October 8, 1857.  Munson and Burton were second cousins.  They had three children together, but only one survived infancy.  His wife died of cancer in 1882.

References

External links
 

1822 births
1892 deaths
Politicians from La Crosse, Wisconsin
Wisconsin lawyers
19th-century American politicians
19th-century American lawyers
Members of the Wisconsin State Assembly
Wisconsin state court judges